Rubelsanto Airport  is an airport serving the village of Rubelsanto in Alta Verapaz Department, Guatemala.

The Rubelsanto non-directional beacon (Ident: RUB) is on the field.

See also

Transport in Guatemala
List of airports in Guatemala

References

External links
 OurAirports - Rubelsanto
 Rubelsanto
 OpenStreetMap - Rubelsanto
 

Airports in Guatemala
Alta Verapaz Department